An unplanned economy is an economy where economic decisions regarding production, investment and resource allocation are not linked together through conscious economic planning. This may refer to subsistence-level economies, systems of barter or to more complex arrangements such as market economies, and hypothetical systems such as self-managed, distributed and network economies. Note that there may be a significant amount of planning within firms in market and mixed-market economies.

See also 
 Economic planning
 Economic system
 Gift economy
 Hunter-gatherer economy
 Market economy
 Mixed economy
 Self-managed economy

References 

Economic systems